Bridge is a village in Cornwall, England, United Kingdom. It is about 1 km east of Portreath (where the 2011 census population is included).

References

Villages in Cornwall